Tecmerium perplexum is a moth in the family Blastobasidae. It is found in Hungary, Slovakia, Greece, Turkey and on Cyprus.

References

Moths described in 1957
Blastobasidae
Moths of Europe